Jürgen Milewski (born 19 October 1957) is a German former professional footballer who played as a striker.

Club career 
He spent nine seasons in the Bundesliga with Hannover 96, Hertha BSC and Hamburger SV. He played the 1985–86 season with AS Saint-Étienne.

International career 
Milewski represented Germany in a 1982 FIFA World Cup qualifier against Albania and two friendlies.

Career after pro times 
The former international worked as a player agent for IMG.

Honours
Hamburger SV
 European Cup:  1982–83. runner-up 1979–80
 UEFA Cup: runner-up 1981–82
 Bundesliga: 1981–82, 1982–83
 DFB-Pokal: runner-up 1978–79

References

External links
 
 
 
 

1957 births
Living people
Footballers from Hanover
German footballers
Association football forwards
Germany international footballers
Germany B international footballers
Germany under-21 international footballers
Bundesliga players
2. Bundesliga players
Ligue 2 players
Hannover 96 players
Hertha BSC players
Hamburger SV players
Hamburger SV II players
AS Saint-Étienne players
West German expatriate footballers
West German expatriate sportspeople in France
Expatriate footballers in France
20th-century German people
West German footballers